Brachystomia eulimoides is a species of sea snail, a marine gastropod mollusc in the family Pyramidellidae, the pyrams and their allies.

Description
The milk-white or yellowish white shell is rather solid, nearly opaque, somewhat glossy. Its length measures 5 mm.  It is marked by microscopic spiral striae. The six to seven whorls of the teleoconch are somewhat convex, and rapidly enlarging. The suture is moderate and distinct. The umbilical chink is very narrow or is lacking. The columellar tooth is strong.

Distribution
This species occurs in the following locations:
 Azores Exclusive Economic Zone
 British Isles
 Dorset
 European waters (ERMS scope)
 Goote Bank
 Greek Exclusive Economic Zone
 Irish Exclusive economic Zone
 Portuguese Exclusive Economic Zone
 Spanish Exclusive Economic Zone
 United Kingdom Exclusive Economic Zone

Notes
Additional information regarding this species:
 Habitat: Known from the nearshore.

References

 Kantor Yu.I. & Sysoev A.V. (2006) Marine and brackish water Gastropoda of Russia and adjacent countries: an illustrated catalogue. Moscow: KMK Scientific Press. 372 pp. + 140 pls
 Høisæter, T. (2014). The Pyramidellidae (Gastropoda, Heterobranchia) of Norway and adjacent waters. A taxonomic review. Fauna norvegica. 34: 7-78

External links
 To Biodiversity Heritage Library (30 publications)
 To CLEMAM
 To Encyclopedia of Life
 To World Register of Marine Species
  Y.M.T. McFadden and A.A. Myers, The life history and reproductive biology of Odostomia eulimoides (Gastropoda: Opisthobranchia) on the south coast of Ireland; Journal of the Marine Biological Association of the United Kingdom (1989), 69 : pp 65-80

Pyramidellidae
Gastropods described in 1844